Sultan Ibrahim Jamek Mosque is a historical mosque in Muar Town, Johor, Malaysia. It is situated along Jalan Petri, close to the mouth of Muar River.

History
The first Muar Jamek Mosque was completed in 1887. In the 1920s, a committee was formed to consider building a new Jamek mosque for Muar. Following a bid to raise funds from the public, the committee in charge of building the new mosque successfully raised RM10,000 for the purpose. The committee then put forward the people's aspiration to the Sultan and obtained the royal consent.

In 1925, works to construct Sultan Ibrahim Jamek Mosque began. Five years later, in 1930, the mosque was completed and was officially opened by Johor's Dato' Menteri Besar, Dato Mustafa bin Jaafar.

Architecture
It is built with influences of Western style and Middle Eastern style.

See also
 Islam in Malaysia

References

Mosques in Johor
Muar District
Mosques completed in 1930